Heathmont railway station is located on the Belgrave line in Victoria, Australia. It serves the eastern Melbourne suburb of Heathmont, and opened on 1 May 1926.

History
Heathmont station opened on 1 May 1926 and, like the suburb itself, was named after the extensive heath and shrub-like vegetation across the elevated land in the area.

In 1977, the station building on the city-bound platform (Platform 1) was provided. On 19 December 1982, a second platform (Platform 2) was provided at the station, as part of the duplication of the line between Ringwood and Bayswater.

Platforms and services
Heathmont has two side platforms. It is served by Belgrave line trains.

Platform 1:
  all stations services to Flinders Street; all stations shuttle services to Ringwood

Platform 2:
  all stations services to Upper Ferntree Gully and Belgrave

Transport links
Ventura Bus Lines operates one route via Heathmont station, under contract to Public Transport Victoria:
 : Chirnside Park Shopping Centre – Ringwood station

Gallery

References

External links
 
 Melway map at street-directory.com.au

Railway stations in Melbourne
Railway stations in Australia opened in 1926
Railway stations in the City of Maroondah